Harpalus apache is a species of ground beetle in the subfamily Harpalinae. It was described by Kataev in 2010.

References

apache
Beetles described in 2010